Eufaula (YTB-800) was a United States Navy  named for Eufaula, Alabama.

Construction

The contract for Eufaula was awarded 2 May 1968. She was laid down on 5 August 1968 at Slidell, Louisiana, by Southern Shipbuilding Corp and launched 22 February 1969.

Operational history
Eufaula served the 5th Naval District at Norfolk, Virginia and Naval Station Rota, Spain from 1969 - 1992.

On 7 December 1992, ex-Eufaula was transferred to the Maritime Administration National Defense Reserve Fleet.

References

External links
 

 

Natick-class large harbor tugs
Ships built in Slidell, Louisiana
1966 ships